Northern Courier (Spanish: El correo del norte) is a 1960 Mexican western film directed by Zacarías Gómez Urquiza.

Cast
 Luis Aguilar 
 Fernando Almada 
 José Chávez 
 Rosa de Castilla as Carmela  
 Fernando Fernández 
 Jaime Fernández 
 Rosario Gálvez 
 Arturo Martínez

References

Bibliography 
 Pitts, Michael R. Western Movies: A Guide to 5,105 Feature Films. McFarland, 2012.

External links 
 

1960 films
1960 Western (genre) films
Mexican Western (genre) films
Mexican black-and-white films
1960s Spanish-language films
Films directed by Zacarías Gómez Urquiza
1960s Mexican films